Remi Lee Allen (born 15 October 1990) is an English football midfielder who plays for Aston Villa in the FA Women's Super League.

Career

Club
On 30 June 2016, Reading signed Allen from Birmingham City for an undisclosed fee. On 8 June 2020, Reading announced that Allen had left the club after her contract had expired.

On 22 August 2020, Leicester City announced their signing of Allen ahead of the 2020-21 season, among seven other FA WSL players, as they embarked on their journey as a fully professional club.

International
On 5 May 2014, Allen was called up to the England team for the first time.

References

External links

 
 Remi Allen's player biography on the Reading FC Women's website
 

Living people
1990 births
English women's footballers
Women's association football midfielders
Women's Super League players
Birmingham City W.F.C. players
Notts County L.F.C. players
Reading F.C. Women players
England women's under-23 international footballers
Leicester City W.F.C. players
England women's youth international footballers
Aston Villa W.F.C. players